Erzhan Askarov is a Kyrgyzstani middle-distance runner. At the 2012 Summer Olympics, he competed in the Men's 800 metres.

References

External links
 

Year of birth missing (living people)
Living people
People from Talas Region
Kyrgyzstani male middle-distance runners
Olympic athletes of Kyrgyzstan
Athletes (track and field) at the 2012 Summer Olympics
Athletes (track and field) at the 2010 Asian Games
Asian Games competitors for Kyrgyzstan